James Edward Dorsey (born August 2, 1955) is a retired professional baseball player who played 3 seasons for the California Angels and Boston Red Sox of Major League Baseball.

External links
, or Retrosheet, or Venezuelan Winter League

1955 births
Living people
Baseball players from Illinois
Boston Red Sox players
California Angels players
El Paso Diablos players
Los Angeles Valley Monarchs baseball players
Major League Baseball pitchers
Navegantes del Magallanes players
American expatriate baseball players in Venezuela
Pawtucket Red Sox players
Quad Cities Angels players
Salt Lake City Gulls players
Sportspeople from Oak Park, Illinois
Tiburones de La Guaira players